= Potrikrom =

Protrikrom
- Town
- Location in Ghana
- Coordinates: 6°54′0″N 1°53′0″W
- Country: Ghana
- Region: Ashanti Region

Potrikrom is a small town located in Ahafo-Ano in the Ashanti region of Ghana.
